Matavera FC is a Cook Islands football club located in Matavera, Cook Islands. It currently plays in Cook Islands Round Cup the main football league competition. They have yet to win a championship but have won one Cook Islands Cup.

Titles
Cook Islands Cup: 1
1980

Current squad

References

Football clubs in the Cook Islands